Jens Rolfsen (24 July 1765 – 17 December 1819) was a Norwegian merchant and politician.
                                                          
Rolfsen was born in Kristiansand. He was a shipbuilder, shipmaster, shipowner and wholesaler. He later served as conciliation commissioner in Bergen. He represented Bergen (Bergens Bys) at the Norwegian Constituent Assembly at Eidsvoll in 1814. He generally favored the Independence Party (Selvstendighetspartiet) as did his fellow representatives Wilhelm Frimann Koren Christie, Fredrik Meltzer and Jonas Rein.

He was married to Mette Johansdatter Brun (1774-1844) and was the grandfather of Nordahl Rolfsen and grand-grandfather of Alf Rolfsen.

References

1765 births
1819 deaths
Politicians from Kristiansand
Norwegian merchants
Norwegian shipbuilders
Norwegian businesspeople in shipping
Politicians from Bergen
Fathers of the Constitution of Norway
19th-century Norwegian businesspeople